Sir is the fourth and final studio album by American electroclash duo Fischerspooner, and their first since 2009's Entertainment.  It was released digitally on February 16, 2018, through Ultra Music. A limited run of 500 vinyl versions featuring an alternative artwork was released in conjunction with NAK in Germany.

Critical reception

The album has received a Metacritic score of 67 based on 11 critics, indicating generally favorable reviews.

Track listing
Credits taken from Qobuz.

Notes
  signifies a co-producer.

Charts

References

Fischerspooner albums
2018 albums